Ortha Orrie Barr Jr. (March 4, 1922 – March 24, 2003) was an American attorney who was the Democratic Party candidate for Ohio's 4th congressional district for the U. S. House of Representatives in the 1956 congressional elections. The Republican incumbent in 1956, William Moore McCulloch (1901–1980) defeated Barr in a landslide victory by nearly 38 percentage points. McCulloch was a twelve-term congressman from 1947 to 1973.

Life
Born in 1922 in Ohio, Barr's parents were Ortha Orrie Barr Sr. (1879–1958) and Bertha Anna Woerner (1881–1953). Ortha Barr Jr. served in the United States Army during World War II, and became a prisoner of war. He was detained at the Stalag B Camp in Bad Orb, Hessen-Nassau in the then Prussia. He attained the rank of sergeant. Before the conscription, he had completed two years of college and was skilled in metal product fabrication.

After the war, he studied accounting at the University of Michigan, graduating with a bachelor's degree in 1951. He continued his studies at the University of Michigan Law School (Class of 1954), where his father, Ortha O. Barr Sr. had graduated from with an LLB degree in 1904. Ortha Barr Jr. married Marie Virginia Infante (28 November 1925 – 25 June 2011) in 1945 and they had five children. He died in 2003 and was buried at the Ohio Western Reserve National Cemetery in Rittman, Medina County.

References 

1922 births
2003 deaths
Ohio lawyers
People from Allen County, Ohio
Military personnel from Ohio
Ohio Democrats
Christians from Ohio
20th-century American politicians
University of Michigan Law School alumni
United States Army personnel of World War II
American prisoners of war in World War II
United States Army soldiers
World War II prisoners of war held by Germany
20th-century American lawyers